Sandahöjd is a residential area in Umeå, Sweden.

External links
Sandahöjd at Umeå Municipality

Umeå